"Salvation" is a song recorded by British singer-songwriter Gabrielle Aplin and released as the fifth single from her debut studio album English Rain (2013). The song was released in the United Kingdom as a digital download on 12 January 2014 through Parlophone. The song peaked at number 122 on the UK Singles Chart, the song has also peaked at number 60 in Australia. The song was featured in the second trailer to the animated film The Little Prince (2015).

A remix with HEYHEY was released on 12 February 2016.

Music video
A music video to accompany the release of "Salvation" was first released onto YouTube on 2 December 2013 at a total length of four minutes and six seconds.

Track listing

Chart performance

Release history

References

2014 singles
2014 songs
Gabrielle Aplin songs
Folk ballads
Songs written by Joel Pott
Songs written by Gabrielle Aplin